Shane Booysen (born 23 November 1988) is a South African footballer who plays for Phnom Penh Crown in Cambodian League.

References

External links

1988 births
Living people
South African soccer players
Sportspeople from Cape Town
South African expatriate soccer players
Expatriate footballers in Thailand
Association football forwards
Expatriate footballers in Cambodia
Phnom Penh Crown FC players
Nagaworld FC players